Gordon Bennett Bromley (14 June 1916 – 17 April 2006) was a long distance runner from New Zealand. Competing in the marathon he won five national titles and placed seventh at the 1950 British Empire Games. He also won the Wellington 20-mile cross-country race in 1949 and 1950, improving the course record by almost five minutes.

Bromley was born at Scotts Ferry, but lived most of his life in or near Marton, New Zealand. He ran long distances from school age, and later averaged 120 km per week in training, often exceeding 160 km. One year he ran nearly 20,000 km. His long-time rival Arthur Lydiard once remarked: "I could never beat Brom in a marathon. He had too many miles in his legs." In 1937 Bromley married Patricia. They had four children.

References

1916 births
2006 deaths
New Zealand male marathon runners
New Zealand male long-distance runners
Athletes (track and field) at the 1950 British Empire Games
Commonwealth Games competitors for New Zealand